Daniel Joseph Thomas (born 12 November 1961) is an English former professional footballer who played for Coventry City and Tottenham Hotspur and for the England national team. He was a member of the Tottenham Hotspur team that won the 1983–84 UEFA Cup, despite missing his penalty in the shootout in the final against Anderlecht.

Club career

Thomas made his debut for Coventry City during the 1979–80 season, making 3 appearances during that season. Over the next three seasons he was a regular for the first team. In June 1983 he was transferred to Tottenham Hotspur for a fee of £250,000. He made his Tottenham league debut on 27 August 1983 in a 3–1 defeat at Ipswich Town. He collected a UEFA Cup winner's medal at the end of the 1983–84 season and made a total of 87 league appearances for the White Hart Lane club, scoring once, before suffering a knee injury in 1987 following a tackle by Gavin Maguire. He retired the following year, having failed to recover from the injury.

Appearances
Coventry City: 
 1979-1980     Played   3     Scored   0   goals   (Division 1)
 1980-1981     Played   25     Scored   1   goal   (Division 1)
 1981-1982     Played   39     Scored   1   goal   (Division 1)
 1982-1983     Played   41     Scored   3   goals   (Division 1)
   
Tottenham:  
 1983-1984     Played   27     Scored   0   goals   (Division 1)
 1984-1985     Played   16     Scored   0   goals   (Division 1)
 1985-1986     Played   27     Scored   1   goal   (Division 1)
 1986-1987     Played   17     Scored   0   goals   (Division 1)
 1987-1988     Played   0     Scored   0   goals   (Division 1)

International career
He was capped twice by England during the tour of Australia in June 1983, playing 137 minutes for the national side. He is the only English player to win the UEFA Under-21 Championship twice.

Career after football

He completed a degree in physiotherapy after his career came to an end at the age of 26 after a serious injury. With the assistance of the Professional Footballers' Association he completed a master's degree.
After a short period as physio with West Bromwich Albion he went on to run his own practice in Coventry before working in Florida.

Honours

Tottenham Hotspur
 UEFA Cup winner: 1984

Individual
 Coventry City Hall of Fame

References

External links
englandstats.com - England profile

1961 births
Living people
Footballers from Worksop
English footballers
England international footballers
England under-21 international footballers
Association football defenders
Tottenham Hotspur F.C. players
Coventry City F.C. players
English Football League players
UEFA Cup winning players
Association football physiotherapists